Norma Thomas (born 13 June 1940) is a British diver. She competed in the women's 10 metre platform event at the 1960 Summer Olympics.

References

1940 births
Living people
British female divers
Olympic divers of Great Britain
Divers at the 1960 Summer Olympics
Sportspeople from Somerset